Andrew James Breitbart (February 1, 1969 – March 1, 2012) was an American conservative journalist and political commentator who was the founder of Breitbart News and a co-founder of HuffPost.

After helping in the early stages of HuffPost and the Drudge Report, Breitbart created Breitbart News, a far-right news and opinion website, which has been described as misogynistic, xenophobic, and racist by academics and journalists. He played central roles in the Anthony Weiner sexting scandal, the firing of Shirley Sherrod, and the ACORN 2009 undercover videos controversy. Commenters such as Nick Gillespie and Conor Friedersdorf have credited Breitbart with changing how people wrote about politics by "show[ing] how the Internet could be used to route around information bottlenecks imposed by official spokesmen and legacy news outlets".

Early life
Breitbart was born to Irish American parents in Los Angeles on February 1, 1969. According to his birth certificate, his biological father was a folk singer. When he was three weeks old, he was adopted by Gerald and Arlene Breitbart, a restaurant owner and banker respectively, and grew up in the affluent neighborhood of Brentwood. His adoptive family was Jewish; his mother had converted to Judaism when marrying his father. Breitbart studied at Hebrew school and had a Bar Mitzvah. Theologically he was an agnostic.

Breitbart attended Brentwood School, one of the country's top private schools, but did not distinguish himself, saying: "My sense of humor saved me". However, he discovered that he loved writing, publishing his first comedic piece in the school newspaper, the Brentwood Eagle, analyzing the inequality in his high school's senior and junior parking lots: "One had Mercedes and BMWs, the other Sciroccos and GTIs."" Breitbart remembers his upbringing as apolitical, except in one instance: when the family's rabbi tried to defend Jesse Jackson against charges of antisemitism after his "Hymietown" comment, his parents left the synagogue in protest.

Breitbart would remain "proudly and playfully Jewish" throughout his life, although not always religiously observant. He would sing Hebrew songs at work while also teasing his Orthodox Jewish colleagues for keeping to a kosher diet. Joel Pollak wrote: "He carried his faith as he carried all his convictions: with a lighthearted touch but a deep commitment." Breitbart later said of his profession: "I'm glad I've become a journalist because I'd like to fight on behalf of the Israeli people... And the Israeli people, I adore and I love."

While in high school, Breitbart worked as a pizza delivery driver; he sometimes delivered to celebrities such as Judge Reinhold. He earned a BA in American studies from Tulane University in 1991, graduating with "no sense of [his] future whatsoever." His early jobs included a stint at cable channel E! Entertainment Television, working for the company's online magazine, and some time in film production. He was a Lincoln Fellow at the Claremont Institute in 2009.

Previously left-leaning in his politics, Breitbart changed his political views after experiencing "an epiphany" while watching the late 1991 confirmation hearings for Supreme Court justice Clarence Thomas, due to what he considered unfounded attacks on the part of liberals based on former employee Anita Hill's sexual harassment accusations. Breitbart later described himself as "a Reagan conservative" with libertarian sympathies.

Listening to radio hosts such as Rush Limbaugh helped Breitbart refine his political and philosophical positions, igniting an interest in learning that he had suppressed as a result of his distaste for the "nihilistic musings of dead critical theorists" that had dominated his studies at Tulane. In this era, Breitbart also read Camille Paglia's book Sexual Personae (1990), a massive survey of Western art, literature and culture from ancient Egypt to the 20th century, which, he wrote, "made me realize how little I really had learned in college."

Public life

Authorship, research, and reporting
Breitbart has been lauded for his role in the "evolution of pioneering websites" including The Huffington Post and The Drudge Report, and later, for Breitbart News. Journalists such as Nick Gillespie and Conor Friedersdorf have credited Breitbart with bringing new voices to debates about politics and culture. Breitbart told Reason in 2004 that, after feeling ignored by existing outlets, "We decided to go out and create our media." Described as "a series of do-it-yourself demonstration projects" and "conversation pits", the Breitbart websites have been both criticized and praised for their role in various political issues. Breitbart has been recognized for adopting an inclusive stance with regard to the participation of gay people in the conservative movement. He has also been credited with helping to derail conspiracy theories about Barack Obama's citizenship.

In 1995, Breitbart saw The Drudge Report and was so impressed that he e-mailed Matt Drudge. Breitbart said, "I thought what he was doing was by far the coolest thing on the Internet. And I still do." Breitbart described himself as "Matt Drudge's bitch" and selected and posted links to other news wire sources. Later, Drudge introduced him to a then still-Republican Arianna Huffington and Breitbart subsequently assisted in the creation of The Huffington Post.

Breitbart wrote a weekly column for The Washington Times, which also appeared at Real Clear Politics. Breitbart also co-wrote the book Hollywood, Interrupted: Insanity Chic in Babylon with Mark Ebner, a book that is highly critical of U.S. celebrity culture. On January 19, 2011, the conservative gay rights group GOProud announced Breitbart had joined its Advisory Council.

In April 2011, Grand Central Publishing released Breitbart's book Righteous Indignation: Excuse Me While I Save the World, in which he discussed his own political evolution and the part he took in the rise of new media, most notably at the Drudge Report and The Huffington Post.

Breitbart News

Breitbart launched his first website as a news site; it is often linked to by the Drudge Report and other websites. It has wire stories from the Associated Press, Reuters, Agence France-Presse, Fox News, PR Newswire, and U.S. Newswire, as well as direct links to a number of major international newspapers. Its political viewpoint as well as its audience runs to the right within the U.S. political spectrum. In 2007, Breitbart launched a video blog, Breitbart.tv.

In February 2011, Breitbart and one of his editors Larry O'Connor were sued for defamation by Shirley Sherrod, who had been fired after Breitbart posted a video of a speech given by Sherrod. The video had been selectively edited to suggest that she had purposely discriminated against a white farmer, while in reality the unedited video told the story of how she had helped that farmer. Breitbart himself maintained that he stated this in his article about it, and that the purpose of the video was to show the crowd's positive reaction to Sherrod's statements about discriminating against the white farmer. In July 2015, it was reported that Sherrod and Breitbart's estate had reached a tentative settlement. It was reported October 1, 2016, that the lawsuit was settled.

In June 2011, Breitbart's websites broke the story that congressman Anthony Weiner was sending underage females revealing photographs of himself.

Commentaries
In 2009, Breitbart appeared as a commentator on Real Time with Bill Maher and Dennis Miller. In 2004, he was a guest commentator on Fox News Channel's morning show and frequently appeared as a guest panelist on Fox News's late night program, Red Eye w/ Greg Gutfeld. Breitbart also appeared as a commentator in the 2004 documentary Michael Moore Hates America.

On October 22, 2009, Breitbart appeared on the C-SPAN program Washington Journal. He gave his opinions on the mainstream media, Hollywood, the Obama Administration and his personal political views, having heated debates with several callers.

In the hours immediately following Senator Ted Kennedy's death, Breitbart called Kennedy a "villain", a "duplicitous bastard", a "prick" and "a special pile of human excrement," adding, "Sorry, he destroyed lives. And he knew it," referring to Kennedy's actions during the Chappaquiddick incident, the Robert Bork Supreme Court nomination, and the Clarence Thomas Supreme Court nomination.

In February 2010, Breitbart received the Reed Irvine Accuracy in Media Award during the Conservative Political Action Conference in Washington, D.C. During his acceptance speech, he responded directly to accusations by The New York Times reporter Kate Zernike that Jason Mattera, a young conservative activist, had been using "racial tones" in his allusions to President Barack Obama, and had spoken in a "Chris Rock voice". From the podium, Breitbart called Zernike "a despicable human being" for having made such allegations about what, according to him, was just Mattera's Brooklyn accent. At the same conference, Breitbart was also filmed saying to journalist Max Blumenthal that he found him to be "a jerk" and "a despicable human being" over a blog entry in which Blumenthal accused Breitbart of employing a racist. Blumenthal was referring to James O'Keefe over his having attended a Georgetown Law Center discussion on race featuring Kevin Martin, John Derbyshire, and Jared Taylor, the last of whom founded American Renaissance, a white supremacist online magazine. Neither O'Keefe nor Breitbart endorsed Taylor's views.

In 2011, Breitbart said that "of course" Donald Trump was not a conservative, adding:

But this is a message to those candidates who are languishing at 2 percent and 3 percent within the Republican Party who are brand names in Washington, but the rest of the country don't know ... celebrity is everything in this country. And if these guys don't learn how to play the media the way that Barack Obama played the media last election cycle and the way that Donald Trump is playing the election cycle, we're going to probably get a celebrity candidate. 

These comments resurfaced after the controversy of Donald Trump hiring Breitbart News''' executive chairman Steve Bannon to be his White House Chief Strategist.

Activism

Breitbart often appeared as a speaker at Tea Party movement events across the U.S. For example, Breitbart was a speaker at the first National Tea Party Convention at Gaylord Opryland Hotel in Nashville on February 6, 2010. Breitbart later involved himself in a controversy over allegations of homophobic and racial slurs being used at a March 20, 2010, rally at the United States Capitol in Washington, D.C., by asserting that slurs were never used, and that "it was a set-up" by Nancy Pelosi and the Democratic Party. Breitbart offered to donate $100,000 to the United Negro College Fund "for any audio/video footage of the N-word being hurled," claiming that the several Congressmen made it up. Breitbart insisted Congressman John Lewis and several other witnesses were forced to lie, concluding that "Nancy Pelosi did a great disservice to a great civil rights icon by thrusting him out there to perform this mischievous task. His reputation is now on the line as a result of her desperation to take down the Tea Party movement."

In February 2012, a YouTube video showed Breitbart yelling at Occupy D.C. protesters outside a Washington hotel hosting a Conservative Political Action Conference (CPAC). The video showed security escorting Breitbart back to the hotel while he told the protesters to "behave yourself", and alluding to reported assaults of women at Occupy encampments, he repeatedly yelled, "Stop raping people", and called the protestors "filthy, filthy, raping, murdering freaks!" David Carr said with the incident Breitbart had caused his last "viral storm on the Web."Sources that describe the confrontation with Occupy protesters at CPAC 2012:
 The Web is Talking About Andrew Breitbart's Occupy D.C. Freakout, by Seth Abramovitch, The Atlantic, February 12, 2012
 Eighty-Seven Seconds of Andrew Breitbart Yelling, by David Weigel, Slate, February 11, 2012
 WATCH: Andrew Breitbart LOSES It On Occupy Wall Street Protesters   , by Grace Wyler, Business Insider, March 6, 2012
 Andrew Breitbart Dies: Most Controversial Moments (Video), by The Daily Beast, March 1, 2012
 Andrew Breitbart Dead at 43, by Kat Stoeffel and Hunter Walker, The New York Observer, January 3, 2012
 EXCLUSIVE VIDEO: Blogger Andrew Breitbart to Occupiers: 'Stop Raping People!'   , by Emily Crockett, Campus Progress, February 10, 2012
 Andrew Breitbart Confronts Occupy Crowd At CPAC, Demands They 'Stop Raping People', by Frances Martel, Mediaite, March 1, 2012
 Right-Wing Blog Mogul Andrew Breitbart Flips Out at Occupy D.C. Outside CPAC  , by Benjamin R. Freed, DCist, February 10, 2012
 Occupiers Berated By Breitbart; Times Looks At Movement's Next Moves , by Esther Zuckerman, The Village Voice, February 11, 2012

Breitbart appeared posthumously in Occupy Unmasked, a documentary film by Steve Bannon that contends that the Occupy Wall Street movement of "largely naïve students and legitimately concerned citizens looking for answers" is actually orchestrated by sinister, violent, and organized leaders with the purpose of not just changing, but destroying the American government.

Breitbart Doctrine
The Breitbart Doctrine is the idea that "politics is downstream from culture" and that to change politics one must first change culture.

Chris Wylie (formerly of Cambridge Analytica) stated in an interview with The Guardian: "The reason why he (Steve Bannon) was interested in this is because he believes in this idea of the ‘Breitbart Doctrine,’ which is that if you want to change politics you first have to change culture because politics flows from culture. If you want to change culture, you have to first understand what the units of culture are, and the people are the units of culture. So, if you want to change politics, you first have to change people to change culture." Breitbart considered this idea an important one and often spoke of it in interview or cited it in print.

 Political views 
Breitbart described himself as “eighty-five per cent conservative and fifteen per cent libertarian”. Breitbart had previously described himself as a Democrat but shifted towards being conservative after witnessing the Democrats' treatment of Clarence Thomas during his senate confirmation hearing.

He supported legalization of prostitution, gay rights, and drug liberalization. He was an opponent of multiculturalism and political correctness. Breitbart argued for US military intervention in Syria, North Korea, Iran, and China for humanitarian reasons. He was also a supporter of Israel.

Breitbart was a proponent of the Cultural Marxism conspiracy theory, claiming there are academics attempting to undermine western culture.

Personal life and death
Breitbart was married to Susannah Bean, the daughter of actor Orson Bean and fashion designer Carolyn Maxwell, and had four children.

At around 11:30 p.m. PST on February 29, 2012, Breitbart collapsed on a street near his home in Brentwood. He was rushed to Ronald Reagan UCLA Medical Center, where he was pronounced dead 12:19 a.m. on March 1, 2012. He was 43 years old. An autopsy by the Los Angeles County Coroner's Office showed that he had hypertrophic cardiomyopathy with focal coronary atherosclerosis and died from heart failure, which he had been diagnosed with the year prior. His burial was in the Jewish cemetery Hillside Memorial Park.

 Tributes 
Rick Santorum, Reince Priebus, Mitt Romney, Jonah Goldberg, Joel Pollak, Sarah Palin, Matt Drudge, Sean Hannity, Michael Steele, Tucker Carlson, Glenn Beck, Rush Limbaugh, and Newt Gingrich paid tribute to Breitbart. Santorum called Breitbart's death "a huge loss" that strongly affected him. Romney praised Breitbart as a "fearless conservative," while Gingrich remembered him as "the most innovative pioneer in conservative activist social media in America". A special episode of Red Eye w/ Greg Gutfeld'' aired the day after his death as the host and panelists paid their tributes and showed clips from his appearances on the show.

Works

References

External links

 
 
 
 

1969 births
2012 deaths
20th-century American male writers
20th-century American non-fiction writers
21st-century American male writers
21st-century American non-fiction writers
Activists from California
American Zionists
American adoptees
American agnostics
American alternative journalists
American bloggers
American male bloggers
American male non-fiction writers
American online journalists
American people of Irish descent
American political commentators
American political writers
Breitbart News people
Brentwood School (Los Angeles) alumni
Burials at Hillside Memorial Park Cemetery
California Republicans
Deaths from cardiomyopathy
Deaths from congestive heart failure
Deaths from coronary artery disease
HuffPost
Jewish American journalists
Jewish American writers
Jewish agnostics
National Review people
People from Brentwood, Los Angeles
Tea Party movement activists
The Washington Times people
Tulane University alumni
Writers from Los Angeles